Veselinov is a Slavic surname. Notable people with the surname include:

Dragan Veselinov, Serbian politician
Georgi Veselinov – Zograf (1843–1886), Bulgarian painter and politician
Nikolay Veselinov Hristov (born 1989), Bulgarian footballer
Tsvetan Veselinov (1947–2018), Bulgarian footballer
Valentin Veselinov (born 1992), Bulgarian footballer
Vladimir Veselinov (born 1984), Serbian footballer

Bulgarian-language surnames
Serbian surnames